Foligno (Southern Umbrian: Fuligno) is an ancient town of Italy in the province of Perugia in east central Umbria, on the Topino river where it leaves the Apennines and enters the wide plain of the Clitunno river system.

While Foligno is an active bishopric, one of its civil parishes, San Giovanni Profiamma, is the historical site of the former bishopric of Foro Flaminio, which remains a Latin Catholic titular see.

Foligno railway station forms part of the main line from Rome to Ancona, and is the junction for Perugia; it is thus an important rail centre, with repair and maintenance yards for the trains of central Italy, and was therefore subjected to severe Allied aerial bombing in World War II, responsible for its relatively modern aspect, although it retains some medieval monuments. Of its Roman past no significant trace remains, with the exception of the regular street plan of the centre. Other resources include sugar refineries and metallurgical, textile, building materials and paper and timber industries. After the war, the city's position in the plain and again its rail connections have led to a considerable suburban spread with the attendant problems of traffic and air pollution, as well as a severe encroachment on the Umbrian wetlands.

History 
Foligno seems to have been founded by Umbrians in the pre-Roman period (probably 8th century BC). It was conquered by the Romans after the Battle of Sentinum in 295 BC, receiving the name of Fulginiae from the ancient cult of the goddess Fulginia. In the classic Roman age the city acquired importance first as a municipium, later as the seat of a prefecture and finally as a Statio principalis of road traffic along the ancient Via Flaminia.

The city began to decay in the late Roman Empire years: after the fall of the latter, Fulginiae became part of the Duchy of Spoleto, and was sacked by the Saracens in 881 and ruined by Magyars in 915 and again in 924: its inhabitants therefore decided to move, settling around the nearby Civitas Sancti Feliciani (former Castrum Sancti Feliciani), a church strengthened by walls where the Bishop and martyr Feliciano was buried in the 3rd century AD and which was then already populated. The new seat had also attracted people from Forum Flaminii (now San Giovanni Profiamma), a neighbouring city and former bishopric that had been destroyed by the Lombards under Liutprand but remains a Latin Catholic titular see.

Foligno recovered and continued to grow, ultimately gaining the status of free city in 1165 thanks to emperor Frederick Barbarossa. Siding first with the Guelph party, after its occupation by Corrado Guiscardo, a captain of emperor Frederick II, it became Ghibelline as a fierce rival of the Guelph Perugia. It changed hands often during the wars of the 13th century, until 1305 when it was seized by the powerful Guelph family of the Trinci, acting as semi-independent deputies of the Holy See. During this period Foligno flourished and reached the height of its wealth and, especially in the 15th century, was a centre of art thanks to the family's patronage of arts (exemplified by the Palazzo Trinci). It controlled a large territory, including Assisi, Bevagna, Giano, Montefalco, Nocera and Spello.

When Corrado Trinci turned against the Papal authority, Pope Eugene IV sent a force against Foligno in 1439, led by Cardinal Giovanni Vitelleschi. The inhabitants opened their gates and Corrado was beheaded in 1441 in the castle of Soriano. Henceforth Foligno belonged to the Papal States until 1860, with the exception of the Napoleonic era, when it was part of the Roman Republic (1799) then of the French Empire (1809‑1814). The citizens took an active part in the Risorgimento wars, and on 14 September 1860 Savoy troops took the city and annexed it to the Kingdom of Italy.

It has suffered from several major earthquakes, among which those of 1832 and 1997.

Main sights 
Main attractions of the city include:
Palazzo Comunale, built in the 13th century and rebuilt various times during the 16th and the 17th centuries.  Its present Neo-Classical façade was carried out between 1835 and 1838. The bell tower is still the original from the 13th century.
Adjoining the Palazzo Comunale is the Palazzo Orfini, built in Renaissance style, where the first printing shop opened by Emiliano Orfini around 1470. An inscription on the current façade (built in 1507) commemorates the printing in April 1472 of Dante's Divine Comedy here by Johann Neumeister, a former pupil of Gutenberg. This was the first book printed in the Italian language.
Cathedral of San Feliciano or Duomo (1133–1201), episcopal see of the present Diocese of Foligno : a Romanesque building (the interior, however, was completely reworked in the 18th century). There is a copy of original Saint Peter's baldachin designed by the Italian sculptor and architect Gian Lorenzo Bernini.
Santa Maria Infraportas, the oldest church in town, although the present edifice dates to the 11th century.

The Church of San Giacomo dates from 1402.
Trinci Palace (1389–1407), which houses an archaeological museum, the city's picture gallery, a multimedia museum of Tournaments and Jousts and the Civic Museum. The façade was rebuilt in Neoclassicist style after the earthquakes in 1831–1832. It houses frescoes from the early 15th century, some attributed to Gentile da Fabriano.
Ospedale Vecchio : a stately Renaissance building (1517–1520) with an eleven-arch portico on the Corso Cavour
Palazzo Cantagilli (15th century), Palazzo Morotti (17th century) and Palazzo Roncalli (16th century) on the Corso Cavour
Church of S. Agostino (18th century) : brickwork façade with four Corinthian columns (on the Piazza Garibaldi)
Church of S. Salvatore (12th century): the façade (14th century) was built with alternating rows of red and white stone and has three ogival portals. (on the Piazza Garibaldi)
Church of the Suffragio (18th century) was built with a Greek cross-layout and an Ionic style façade.
Oratory of Nunziatella, built in Renaissance style by (attributed to) Francesco di Bartolomeo da Pietrasanta after a miraculous event in 1489. The rectangular oratory contains two altars on the back wall and one altar on each sidewall with paintings from several periods. Its most famous painting is "Baptism of Jesus" by Perugino (1507), commissioned by Giovanni Battista Morganti. A fragment of the miraculous image of the Virgin was enclosed in a tabernacle of gilded wood. It was placed in front of a fresco by Giovanni Antonio Pandolfi da Pesaro (1575), representing the Holy Spirit among angels with St. Feliciano and the Blessed Pietro Crisci. The sacristy contains a damaged fresco of the Pietà, recently attributed to Giannicola di Paolo. In the same room stands the printing press on which the first edition of Dante's Divina Commedia was printed on 11 April 1472.
The Abbey of Sassovivo,  to the east, with cloisters of 1229 with pairs of small columns supporting arches, and Cosmatesque decorations.

Culture 
The name of Foligno was famous for a noteworthy school of painting in the 15th century, and its name is carried by the Madonna of Foligno, now in the Vatican, was painted by the Urbinate artist Raphael for the nobleman Sigismondo di Comitibus.

The first printed edition of Dante's Divina Commedia was printed in the Orfini Palace at Foligno on 5 and 6 April 1472 by Johannes Neumeister and Evangelista Mei, when the sheets for 300 copies were made.

The city is also notable as the birthplace of St Angela of Foligno (1248–1309).

Quarters 
The historical centre of Foligno is traditionally divided into twenty rioni ("quarters"). Only ten of those are officially recognized and can take part in the Giostra della Quintana :

Ammanniti
Badia
Cassero
Contrastanga
Croce Bianca
Giotti
La Mora
Morlupo
Pugilli
Spada

Ten "defunct" rioni have been absorbed by the ones above: Borgo, Fonte del Campo, Cipischi, Croce, Falconi, Feldenghi, Franceschi, Menacoda, Piazza Vecchia and Spavagli.

The Giostra della Quintana is a knight ring jousting tournament based on a historical event. It takes place in the town of Foligno. Actually the challenges take place in June (1st Challenge) during a Saturday night and September (the counter-challenge) the 2nd or 3rd Sunday of September.
The definition of Quintana comes from the 5th road of the Roman military Camps, where the soldiers were trained to the lance fighting. They run against a dummy-soldier, trying to catch a ring hanging from an arm of the dummy. Here the origin of the tournament's name, but the first definition and documented "Quintana" as a knights' jousting tournament during a festival, dates back to 1448. Since then, Foligno's "Quintana" was held uninterruptedly every year. In 1946 the actual "Giostra della Quintana" was reborn. In 1613 the Priors included the Quintana in the events of Carnival festivals, and all has been historically documented. There are ten knights, each representing a quarter of the town. Rushing at gallop, they have to catch 3 rings having smaller size at each tournament. The rings are hanging from a rotating statue represent Mars, the Roman God of War. The statue is in oak original dating back until 1613 (17th century) having a shield and a straight arm. A number of happenings involve the whole town and a parade of 800 persons dressed in original-like precious dresses walk in the town the day before the joust takes place.

Frazioni

Abbazia di Sassovivo, Acqua Santo Stefano, Afrile, Aghi, Ali, Annifo, Arvello, Ascolano, Barri, Belfiore, Borgarella, Borroni, Budino, Camino, Cancellara, Cancelli, Cantagalli, Capodacqua, Caposomigiale, Cappuccini, Cariè, Carpello, Casa del Prete, Casa Pacico, Casale del Leure, Casale della Macchia, Casale di Morro, Casale di Scopoli, Cascito, Casco dell'Acqua, Casenove, Casevecchie, Cassignano, Castello di Morro, Castretto, Cavallara, Cave, Cerritello, Chieve, Cifo, Civitella, Colfiorito, Collazzolo, Colle di Verchiano, Colle San Giovanni, Colle San Lorenzo, Colle Scandolaro, Collelungo, Collenibbio, Colpernaco, Colpersico, Corvia, Costa di Arvello, Crescenti, Croce di Roccafranca, Croce di Verchiano, Cupacci, Cupigliolo, Cupoli, Curasci, Fiamenga, Fondi, Forcatura, Fraia, Hoffmann, La Franca, La Spiazza, La Valle, Leggiana, Liè, Maceratola, Maestà di Colfornaro, Madonna delle Grazie, Montarone, Morro, Navello, Orchi, Palarne, Pale, Perticani, Pescara I°, Pescara II°, Pieve Fanonica, Pisenti, Poggiarello, Polveragna, Ponte San Lazzaro, Ponte Santa Lucia, Pontecentesimo, Popola, Rasiglia, Ravignano, Rio, Roccafranca, Roviglieto, San Bartolomeo, San Giovanni Profiamma (site of a Roman town and the former Diocese of Foro Flaminii, now a Latin Catholic titular see), San Vittore, Sant'Eraclio, Santo Stefano dei Piccioni, Scafali, Scandolaro, Scanzano, Scopoli, Seggio, Serra Alta, Serra Bassa, Serrone, Sostino, Sterpete, Tesina, Tito, Torre di Montefalco, Treggio, Uppello, Vallupo, Vegnole, Verchiano, Vescia, Vionica, Volperino.

Notable people

Angelo da Foligno (1226-1312), priest of the Order of Saint Augustine and saint 
Angela of Foligno (1248–1309), a Franciscan tertiary, mystic and saint called "Mistress of Theologians" was born at Foligno
Antonia of Florence (1402–1472), Franciscan and saint
Giovanni di Corraduccio (fl. c. 1404–1437), painter, was born here
Pier Antonio Mezzastris (c. 1430 – c. 1506), painter, was born at Foligno 
Niccolò Alunno, Italian painter, born in Foligno in 1430
Antimo Liberati, Italian music theorist, composer, and singer, born in Foligno in 1617
Fra Umile da Foligno (fl. late 17th-century), a Franciscan friar and painter in Perugia and Rome, was born in Foligno. 
Mariano Armellino, Benedictine historian, died in Foligno in 1737
Liborio Coccetti, Italian painter, born in Foligno  1739  
Caterina Scarpellini (1808–1873), astronomer, was born and brought up at Foligno.
Piero Bernocchi (1947), activist
Leonardo Spinazzola (1993), professional football player for Italy national football team and Serie A club AS Roma.

International relations

Twin towns — Sister cities

Foligno is twinned with:
 Gemona del Friuli, Italy
 La Louvière, Belgium
 Shibukawa, Japan

References

External links 

Official town's website
Official Giostra della Quintana website
Bill Thayer's site

 
Roman sites of Umbria
Cities and towns in Umbria
Populated places established in the 8th century BC
8th-century BC establishments in Italy
290s BC establishments in Europe
3rd-century BC establishments in the Roman Republic
3rd-century BC establishments in Italy